The D.I.C.E. Award for Outstanding Achievement in Story is an award presented annually by the Academy of Interactive Arts & Sciences during the academy's annual D.I.C.E. Awards. This award is "presented to the individual or team whose work has furthered the interactive experience through the creation of a game world — whether an original creation, one adapted from existing material, or an extension of an existing property which best exemplifies the coalescence of setting, character, and plot." It was first offered at the 2nd Annual Interactive Achievement Awards, with its first winner being Pokémon Red and Blue.

The award's most recent winner is God of War Ragnarök, developed by Santa Monica Studio and published by Sony Interactive Entertainment.

History 
The award was originally presented as the Outstanding Achievement in Character or Story Development, recognizing "the individual or team whose work has furthered the interactive experience through the creation of a memorable character or a memorable story within an interactive title." This would be renamed to the Outstanding Achievement in Story and Character Development for the 2006 Awards and then simplified to the Outstanding Achievement in Story Development for the 2008 Awards. The award would be separated into the Outstanding Achievement in Original Story and the Outstanding Achievement in Adapted Stoy for the 2009 Awards. Original Story for the "creation of an original game world" and Adapted Story for "a game based on previously existing material" which "can be an adaptation or an extension of existing licensed property or brand. The two categories were merged back into one at the 2011 Awards.
Outstanding Achievement in Character or Story Development (1999–2005)
Outstanding Achievement in Story and Character Development (2006–2007)
Outstanding Achievement in Story Development (2008)
Outstanding Achievement in Original Story (2009–2010)
Outstanding Achievement in Adapted Story (2009–2010)
Outstanding Achievement in Story (2011–present)

Winners and nominees

1990s

2000s

2010s

2020s

Multiple nominations and wins

Developers and publishers 
Sony has currently published the most nominees and the most winners, with its developer Naughty Dog having developed the most nominees and the most winners. Sony is also the only publisher to publish back-to-back winners. The only other developers to have developed more than one winner are BioWare, Bethesda Game Studios, and Sony's Santa Monica Studio. Ubisoft currently has published the most nominees without having published a single winner.

{| class="wikitable sortable plainrowheaders" rowspan="2" style="text-align:center;" background: #f6e39c;
|+ Publishers
|-
! scope="col" | Publisher
! scope="col" | Nominations
! scope="col" | Wins
|-
|Sony Computer/Interactive Entertainment
| 19
| 8
|-
|Nintendo
| 7
| 3
|-
|Microsoft/Xbox Game Studios
| 6
| 2
|-
|Warner Bros. Interactive Entertainment
| 4
| 2
|-
|LucasArts
| 3
| 2
|-
|Electronic Arts
| 6
| 1
|-
|2K Games
| 5
| 1
|-
|Bethesda Softworks
| 5
| 1
|-
|Eidos Interactive/Square Enix Europe
| 5
| 1
|-
|Activision
| 4
| 1
|-
|Telltale Games
| 4
| 1
|-
|Interplay Productions
| 2
| 1
|-
|Ubisoft
| 11
| 0
|-
|Annapurna Interactive
| 5
| 0
|-
|Rockstar Games
| 4
| 0
|-
|Sega
| 3
| 0
|-
|THQ
| 3
| 0
|-
|Atari
| 2
| 0
|-
|Bandai Namco Entertainment
| 2
| 0
|-
|Finji
| 2
| 0
|-
|Konami
| 2
| 0
|-
|Midway Games
| 2
| 0
|-
|Sierra On-Line
| 2
| 0
|-
|SquareSoft
| 2
| 0
|-
|Valve
| 2
| 0
|}

 Franchises Uncharted currently is the most nominated franchise and is one of three franchises that have won more than once. The other three are God of War, The Last of Us, and games from the Star Wars universe. Grand Theft Auto'' is the most nominated franchise that has never won.

Notes

References 

D.I.C.E. Awards
Awards established in 1999
Awards for best video game